For the American TV series starring Diana Rigg, see Diana (American TV series).

Diana is a British television drama series first broadcast by the BBC in 1984. It was adapted by Andrew Davies from two R. F. Delderfield novels.

It follows the intersecting but very different lives of Jan Leigh (Kevin McNally), a poor but studious young country lad and Diana Gayelorde-Sutton (Jenny Seagrove), the equally single minded daughter of a rich landowner, from the 1920s through to post-war Britain. The early story revolves around the class mismatch between the pair; the besotted Jan attempts to elevate his status through hard work and the more aloof Diana attempts to keep her affections in check and pursue her own goals.

The story is mainly told from Jan's POV, as Diana comes unexpectedly (and disruptively) back into his life at various points, then departs as unpredictably as she came.  A recurrent theme (depicted memorably in the show's animated opening credits sequence) is a pair of Common Buzzards they used to see as children, circling each other over a field—coming together to rear young during the breeding season, then parting for a time.  Somehow always together, even when separated. Mated for life.

The complete series of ten episodes is available on DVD in the UK through Simply Media.

Episodes

Broadcast Thursday evenings on BBC1 at 9:25pm, except Episode 10, broadcast at 9:35pm. Produced by Ken Riddington.

Main cast: Kevin McNally, Jenny Seagrove, Patsy Kensit, Harold Innocent, Mary Morris, Fulton Mackay, Jonathan Lynn, Moray Watson, Gillian Raine, Michael Melia & Gertan Klauber.

References

External links

BBC television dramas
1984 British television series debuts
Television shows written by Andrew Davies
1984 British television series endings
1980s British drama television series
English-language television shows